Llewellyn Garrish Estes (December 27, 1843 to February 21, 1905) was an American soldier who fought in the American Civil War. Estes received the country's highest award for bravery during combat, the Medal of Honor, for his action at Flint River in Georgia on 30 August 1864. He was honored with the award on 29 August 1894.

Biography
Estes was born in Oldtown, Maine on December 27, 1843. He joined the 1st Maine Volunteer Cavalry Regiment as a first sergeant in October 1861, and was commissioned as first lieutenant in March 1862. He was promoted to captain in August 1863, and was appointed as assistant adjutant general the next month. By the time Estes mustered out in September 1865, he was a major, and had received a brevet promotion to brigadier general. He died on 21 February 1905 and his remains are interred at the Arlington National Cemetery in Virginia.

Medal of Honor citation

See also

 List of American Civil War Medal of Honor recipients: A–F

Notes

1843 births
1905 deaths
People of Maine in the American Civil War
Union Army officers
United States Army Medal of Honor recipients
American Civil War recipients of the Medal of Honor
People from Old Town, Maine